Randal M. Dutra is a special effects artist.

Oscar history
Best Visual Effects:

70th Academy Awards-Nominated for The Lost World: Jurassic Park. Nomination shared with Michael Lantieri, Dennis Muren and Stan Winston. Lost to Titanic.
78th Academy Awards-Nominated for War of the Worlds. Nomination shared with Pablo Helman, Dennis Muren and Daniel Sudick. Lost to King Kong.

Selected filmography
Return of the Jedi (1983)
Gremlins (1984)
Prehistoric Beast (1984)
Dinosaur! (1985)
RoboCop (1987)
Willow (1988)
Jurassic Park (1993)
The Lost World: Jurassic Park (1997)
War of the Worlds (2005)
Jurassic World (2015)

References

External links

Randal M. Dutra personal website

Living people
Special effects people
Year of birth missing (living people)